Floß is a river of Bavaria, Germany. It passes through the town Floß, and flows into the Waldnaab near Neustadt an der Waldnaab.

See also
List of rivers of Bavaria

References

Rivers of Bavaria
Rivers of the Upper Palatine Forest
Rivers of Germany